The Austria national under-18 football team are a feeder team for the main Austria national football team.

The following players were named in the last squad for the friendly match against Italy U18s on 6 March 2013 & Montenegro U18s on 24 April 2013.

Recent results

Current squad
 The following players were called up for the friendly tournament in Croatia.
 Match dates: 7, 10 and 13 June 2021
 Opposition: ,  and 
 Caps and goals correct as of:''' 7 June 2022, after the match against .

References

F
European national under-18 association football teams